The 2016–17 Kansas State Wildcats women's basketball team represented Kansas State University in the 2016–17 NCAA Division I women's basketball season. The Wildcats, led by third-year head coach Jeff Mittie, played their home games at Bramlage Coliseum in Manhattan, Kansas and were members of the Big 12 Conference. They finished the season 23–11, 11–7 in Big 12 play to finish in fourth place. They advanced to the semifinals of the Big 12 women's tournament where they lost to Baylor. They received an at-large bid to the NCAA women's tournament where they defeated Drake in the first round before losing to Stanford in the second round.

Roster

Rankings
2016–17 NCAA Division I women's basketball rankings

Schedule and results 

|-
!colspan=9 style=""| Exhibition

|-
!colspan=9 style=""| Non-conference regular season

|-
!colspan=9 style=""| Big 12 regular season

|-
!colspan=9 style=""| Big 12 Women's tournament

|-
!colspan=9 style=""| NCAA Women's tournament

See also 
 2016–17 Kansas State Wildcats men's basketball team

References

External links
 Official Team Website

Kansas State Wildcats women's basketball seasons
Kansas State
Kansas State